Eyes of Innocence may refer to:

 Eyes of Innocence (Brídín Brennan album), 2005
 Eyes of Innocence (Miami Sound Machine album), 1984